Eilema bilati is a moth of the  subfamily Arctiinae. It is found in the Democratic Republic of Congo.

References

bilati
Insects of the Democratic Republic of the Congo
Moths of Africa
Endemic fauna of the Democratic Republic of the Congo